Angelika Schrobsdorff (24 December 1927 – 30 July 2016) was a German writer.

Life 

Schrobsdorff's was born the daughter of Else Kirschner (1893–1949), an assimilated Jew from Berlin, and her second husband Erich Schrobsdorff (1893–1952), a member of the wealthy Berlin bourgeoisie. Schrobsdorff grew up in Berlin, and in 1939 fled, with her mother and sister Bettina (1922—2007), to Sofia, Bulgaria, where she remained until the end of the war. Her grandmother Minna Kirschner was murdered in Theresienstadt. Her grandfather Daniel Kirschner (1864–1939) died of pneumonia in a Berlin hospital.

In 1947, Schrobsdorff returned to Germany. In 1971, she married the French film-maker Claude Lanzmann (1925–2018), with whom she subsequently lived in Paris. Later she lived in Munich for a few years before emigrating to Israel. She lived in Jerusalem until early 2006, in a house on the Green Line near the Old City.

Schrobsdorff's first novel, Die Herren ("The Gentlemen", 1961) caused a scandal and made her famous. She published a dozen additional books, several of them about Bulgaria. Her memoir of her mother, Du bist nicht so wie andre Mütter (1992, second ed. 1994) was a best-seller and was also made into a film for television (1999). It appeared in English under the title You are not Like Other Mothers in 2012.

Schrobsdorff also worked as an actress; she appeared in Der Ruf ("The Last Illusion", 1949) and in several films and television programs about her own life. One of the most famous ones is the German documentary of Bulgarian filmmaker Christo Bakalski named Ausgerechnet Bulgarien ("Bulgaria of all Places").

Schrobsdorff died on 30 July 2016 in Berlin, Germany, at the age of 88. She is buried in the Jewish Weißensee cemetery in Berlin.

Works
	Die Herren (1961) 
	Der Geliebte (1964) 
	Diese Männer (1966)
	Spuren (1968) 
	Die kurze Stunde zwischen Tag und Nacht (1978) 
	Die Reise nach Sofia, mit einem Vorwort von Simone de Beauvoir, Deutscher Taschenbuch Verlag, München 1983 
	Das Haus im Niemandsland oder Jerusalem war immer eine schwere Adresse (1989) 
	Du bist nicht so wie andre Mütter (1992) 
       You Are not Like Other Mothers" (2012)  
	Der schöne Mann und andere Erzählungen (1993) 
	Jericho: eine Liebesgeschichte (1995) 
	Der schöne Mann und andere Erzählungen (1993) 
	Grandhotel Bulgaria: Heimkehr in die Vergangenheit (1997) 
	Von der Erinnerung geweckt (1999) 
	Wenn ich dich je vergesse, oh Jerusalem (2002)

Literature
      Rengha Rodewill: Angelika Schrobsdorff - Leben ohne Heimat (Biography), be.bra Verlag, Berlin Germany 2017,

Films
Bulgaria of all Places - Angelika Schrobsdorff and her Family, documentary, R: Christo Bakalski, Germany 2007

References

External links

1927 births
2016 deaths
German autobiographers
German women novelists
German actresses
Writers from Berlin
People from Jerusalem
Jewish emigrants from Nazi Germany